The 2009 Las Vegas Locomotives season was the first season for the Las Vegas Locomotives. In the United Football League's Premiere Season, the Locomotives posted a 4–2 record, finishing in second place. They defeated the Florida Tuskers in the 2009 UFL Championship Game in overtime.

Draft

The draft took place on June 19, 2009. Those selected were among participants in earlier workouts held in Orlando as well as Las Vegas. Once a player was picked by a team, his rights were held by that team should he elect to play in the UFL.

Personnel

Staff

Roster

Schedule

Regular season

Championship Game

Standings

Game summaries

Week 1: vs. California Redwoods

Week 2: vs. Florida Tuskers

Week 4: at Florida Tuskers

Week 5: at New York Sentinels

Week 6: at California Redwoods

Week 7: vs. New York Sentinels

References

Las Vegas Locomotives Season, 2009
Las Vegas Locomotives seasons
2009 in sports in Nevada